The Maine Department of Transportation, also known as MaineDOT (occasionally referred to as MDOT), is the office of state government charged with the regulation and maintenance of roads, rail, ferries, and other public transport infrastructure in the state of Maine. An exception is the Maine Turnpike, which is maintained by the Maine Turnpike Authority. MaineDOT reports on the adequacy of roads, highways, and bridges in Maine. It also monitors environmental factors that affect the motor public such as stormwater, ice/snow buildup on roads, and crashes with moose. MaineDOT was founded in 1972 and replaced the former Maine State Highway Commission.

Organization
MaineDOT is an agency that consists of several offices:
 Bureau of Planning
 Bureau of Maintenance and Operations
 Office of Passenger Transportation
 Office of Freight Transportation
 Office of Communications
 Bureau of Project Development
 Capital Resource Management
 Transportation Service Center
 Environmental Office
 Office of Legal Services and Internal Audit
 Safety Office
 Contract Procurement Office
 Office of Engineering Quality and Oversight

Road
See List of Maine State Routes, Interstate 95 in Maine, U.S. Route 1 in Maine and U.S. Route 2 in Maine.

Rail
MaineDOT owns hundreds of miles of railway track in the state, much of it acquired as the result of abandonment of rail on unprofitable lines by private carriers. The state does not itself operate a railway, instead leasing lines or engaging private contractors to operate on state-owned rails:

 Former Bangor and Aroostook Railroad line abandoned by Montreal, Maine and Atlantic Railway:
 Madawaska to Millinocket,  now state-owned / Irving-operated Maine Northern Railway
 Former Belfast and Moosehead Lake Railroad line:
  of heritage line in Waldo County operating as Belfast & Moosehead Lake Railway
 Former Maine Central lines abandoned by Guilford:
 Calais Branch from Bangor to Calais: mostly abandoned, but MaineDOT leases a  segment between Brewer and Ellsworth to the Downeast Scenic Railroad.
 Rockland Branch from Brunswick to Rockland. MaineDOT awarded a lease to the Central Maine and Quebec Railway in September 2015. Freight operations on the branch began on January 1, 2016.

In 2012, MaineDOT sought an operator to restore passenger service on St. Lawrence and Atlantic Railroad tracks to Lewiston and Auburn, Maine."

Ferry

Maine state law requires MaineDOT to operate regular ferry routes, known as the Maine State Ferry Service, to specific island localities along Maine's Atlantic coast. All ferries can carry passengers, vehicles, and freight. , the service consists of six routes.

The law also provides for the Maine State Ferry Service Advisory Board, which is charged with advising MaineDOT on all ferry-related matters and recommending changes via an annual report, as well as naming MaineDOT's ferry vessels and terminals. The board is composed of one member from each island served by the ferries and three members appointed by the Commissioner of Transportation, each with two-year terms.

Besides MaineDOT, coastal Maine is served by a number of other private and public ferry operators. A notable example is Casco Bay Lines, a non-profit created by emergency state legislation in 1981 to maintain ferry service between Portland and islands in the neighboring Casco Bay.

References

External links
 MaineDOT 
 US Department of Transportation

Sources
 Working with the MaineDOT: A Guide for Municipal Officials 

Transportation
Transportation in Maine
State departments of transportation of the United States